Oleh Ivanovych Benko (born 21 October 1969) is a Ukrainian retired professional footballer who played as a left-back.

Club career

Karpaty Lviv
On 6 March 1992 Benko played in the first ever match of the Vyshcha Liha (now called Ukrainian Premier League) for Karpaty Lviv against Chornomorets Odesa.

Honours
Karpaty Lviv
 Ukrainian Cup runner-up: 1992–93

Bukovyna Chernivtsi
 Ukrainian First League runner-up: 1995–96

References

External links
 
 

1969 births
Living people
Footballers from Saint Petersburg
Lviv State University of Physical Culture alumni
Soviet footballers
Soviet Union youth international footballers
Soviet Union under-21 international footballers
Ukrainian footballers
Association football defenders
FC Hoverla Uzhhorod players
FC Volyn Lutsk players
FC SKA-Karpaty Lviv players
FC Dnipro players
FC Karpaty Lviv players
FC Bukovyna Chernivtsi players
FC Metalurh Zaporizhzhia players
FC Polissya Zhytomyr players
Soviet Top League players
Soviet First League players
Soviet Second League players
Ukrainian Premier League players
Ukrainian First League players
20th-century Ukrainian people